"I'm Not Feeling You" is the title of a top ten dance single by Yvette Michele. It is based on a sample from the Sylvester song "Was It Something That I Said" from 1978 as well as Public Enemy's “Public Enemy No. 1.” The track is also based on  Oran "Juice" Jones single "The Rain". Billboard magazine called the single "a fierce debut hit".

Charts

Weekly charts

Year-end charts

References

1997 singles
Hip hop soul songs
1997 songs
Songs written by Harvey Fuqua
Yvette Michele songs